Happy Truck HAPPinas is a Philippine Sunday noontime variety show produced by TV5's entertainment division and VIVA Entertainment and started airing since March 6, 2016. It is mainly presented by Ogie Alcasid, Janno Gibbs, Derek Ramsay, Tuesday Vargas, and Kim Idol. The show is airing every Sunday, 11:00am to 1:00pm on TV5, and it is the biggest project to date this year by the network and hosted by majority of the network's bunch of talents collectively known as "HappyPeeps".

Competed against long-time rivals ASAP of ABS-CBN and Sunday PinaSaya of GMA Network, it serve as the replacement of former show, Happy Truck ng Bayan, whom it was the brainchild project of former TV5's Entertainment Division Head, Wilma Galvante, until she resigned on her position. HTH also served as drive for advertisers and sponsors thru on-ground and below-the-line activation events and pluggings for the network's new shows.

Hosts
Derek Ramsay
Tuesday Vargas
Kim Idol
Shy Carlos
Empoy
Alwyn Uytingco
Eula Caballero
Mark Neumann

Former hosts
Alonzo Muhlach (returned to ABS-CBN)
Ogie Alcasid (returned to ABS-CBN)
Sam Pinto (freelance artist, returned to ABS-CBN)
Gelli de Belen (freelance artist, both with GMA Network and ABS-CBN)
Ritz Azul (moved to ABS-CBN and Brightlight Productions)
Yassi Pressman (returned to ABS-CBN) 
Meg Imperial (freelance artist, both with GMA Network and ABS-CBN)
Roxanne Barcelo (freelance artist, returned to ABS-CBN)
Ella Cruz (freelance artist, returned to ABS-CBN)
Janno Gibbs (freelance artist, now with Net 25)

Featuring
Sexbomb Girls

Sugar and Spice
 Jessie Salvador
 Nathalie Colipano
 Jasmine Hollingworth 
 Nicole Omillo 
 Issa Pressman

YOLOL
 Akihiro Blanco
 Andrew Muhlach
 VJ Marquez
 Jason Salvador 
 Owy Posadas
 Jack Reid

Segments

Linggo Limbo
“Linggo Limbo" is a warm-up game, where the five best limbo rock performers will be chosen by Ogie and Janno to advance in the portion's next level. Each “Linggo Limbo” level correspondents to a cash prize.

Dummy Kong Tawa

IQ ay Pilipino

See also
List of programs broadcast by TV5

References

External links
TV5 website

TV5 (Philippine TV network) original programming
2016 Philippine television series debuts
2016 Philippine television series endings
Philippine variety television shows
Filipino-language television shows